The MonsterVerse is an American multimedia franchise and shared fictional universe featuring Godzilla, King Kong, and other monster characters owned and created by Toho Co., Ltd. The franchise is produced by Legendary Pictures and co-produced and distributed by Warner Bros. Pictures. The first installment was Godzilla (2014), a reboot of the Godzilla franchise, which was followed by Kong: Skull Island (2017), a reboot of the King Kong franchise, Godzilla: King of the Monsters (2019), and Godzilla vs. Kong (2021). The franchise received a generally positive reception and has been commercially successful with a combined gross of $1.950 billion worldwide.

The franchise will continue with two television series and an untitled Godzilla vs. Kong sequel concurrently in production.

Development
Writer Max Borenstein stated that the MonsterVerse did not begin as a franchise but as an American reboot of Godzilla. Borenstein credits Legendary Entertainment's founder and then CEO Thomas Tull as the one responsible for the MonsterVerse, having acquired the rights to Godzilla and negotiated the complicated rights to King Kong. Tull had offered Borenstein the opportunity to write the first draft for Kong: Skull Island, with the goal to establish Kong in the same universe as Legendary's Godzilla film. Tull's vision was for the films to one day lead to Godzilla vs. Kong.

Legendary confirmed at the July 2014 San Diego Comic-Con International that it had acquired the licensing rights to Mothra, Rodan, and King Ghidorah from Toho Co., Ltd. and revealed concept footage with the closing title cards reading "Conflict: inevitable. Let them fight". In September 2015, Legendary announced that the film Kong: Skull Island would not be developed with Universal Studios. Instead, it would be developed with Warner Bros., which sparked media speculation that Godzilla and Kong would appear in a film together.

In October 2015, Legendary announced plans to unite Godzilla and Kong in a film titled Godzilla vs. Kong, set for a 2020 release date. Legendary planned to create a shared cinematic franchise "centered around Monarch" (the secret government agency which debuted in 2014's Godzilla) and that "brings together Godzilla and Legendary’s King Kong in an ecosystem of other giant super-species, both classic and new". Later in October, it was announced that Kong: Skull Island would have references to Monarch.

In May 2016, Warner Bros. announced that Godzilla vs. Kong would be released on May 29, 2020, later pushed back to May 21, 2021, and that Godzilla: King of the Monsters would be pushed back from its original June 8, 2018 release date to March 22, 2019, however, the film was later pushed back again to May 31, 2019. In October 2016, Legendary announced that Godzilla: King of the Monsters would be filmed at its parent company Wanda's Oriental Movie Metropolis facility in Qingdao, China, along with Pacific Rim: Uprising. That same month, it was revealed that Legendary was planning a writers room to create their Godzilla–Kong cinematic universe, with Alex Garcia overseeing the project for Legendary.

In early January 2017, Thomas Tull, founder of Legendary, resigned from the company but would remain as producer for the Godzilla–Kong series, which was revealed as the "MonsterVerse". In March 2017, Legendary assembled a writers room led by Terry Rossio to develop the story for Godzilla vs. Kong.

Legendary's license to Godzilla expired in 2020. However, Toho announced in July 2022 that Godzilla would be featured in a sequel to Godzilla vs. Kong. In January 2022, Legendary announced plans for a live-action TV series centered on Godzilla and other Titans.

Films

Godzilla (2014)

The film reimagines Godzilla's origins and is set 15 years after a nuclear meltdown in Japan which was caused by giant parasitic creatures, known as "MUTOs". As two MUTOs ravage the countryside in order to reproduce, they awaken a larger ancient alpha predator, known as "Godzilla", whose existence has been kept secret by the U.S. government since 1954. The film introduces Godzilla, the MUTOs, and the Monarch organization to the MonsterVerse.

In 2004, director Yoshimitsu Banno acquired permission from Toho to produce a short IMAX Godzilla film which was in development for several years until the project was eventually turned over to Legendary Pictures. In March 2010, Legendary announced to have acquired the rights to Godzilla for a feature film reboot. In January 2011, Gareth Edwards was announced as the director for the film. The film was co-produced with Warner Bros. Pictures with filming completed in 2013 in Canada and the United States for release in 2014. Godzilla was released on May 16, 2014, to positive reviews, and was a box office success, grossing $529 million worldwide against a budget of $160 million.

Kong: Skull Island (2017)

In the film, set in 1973, a team of scientists and Vietnam War soldiers travel to an uncharted island in the Pacific and encounter terrifying creatures and the mighty Kong. The film introduces Kong, the Mother Longlegs, the Sker Buffalo, the Mire Squid, the Leafwing, the Psychovulture, the Spore Mantis, the Skull Devil, and the Skullcrawlers to the MonsterVerse and a post-credits scene introduces Rodan, Mothra, and King Ghidorah to the MonsterVerse. The Skull Devil was originally trademarked as "Ramarak the Skullcrawler" until it was abandoned in September 2017.

In July 2014 at the San Diego Comic-Con, Legendary announced a King Kong origin story, initially titled Skull Island, with a release date of November 4, 2016, and Universal Pictures distributing. In September 2014, Jordan Vogt-Roberts was announced as the film's director. In September 2015, Legendary moved development of the film from Universal Pictures to Warner Bros. to create an expanded cinematic universe. Principal photography began on October 19, 2015, in Hawaii and Vietnam. Kong: Skull Island was released on March 10, 2017, to positive reviews, and was a box office success, grossing $566 million worldwide against a budget of $185 million. The film received a nomination for Best Visual Effects at the 90th Academy Awards.

Godzilla: King of the Monsters (2019)

In the film, eco-terrorists release King Ghidorah, who awakens other monsters known as "Titans" across the world, forcing Godzilla and Mothra to surface and engage Ghidorah and Rodan in a decisive battle. The film changes the monsters' designation from "MUTOs" to "Titans". The film introduces Scylla, Methuselah, Behemoth, and the Queen MUTO to the MonsterVerse. Off-screen, the film introduces Baphomet, Typhon, Mokele-Mbembe, Sargon, Tiamat, Abaddon, Leviathan, and Bunyip to the MonsterVerse.

Prior to announcing a shared cinematic universe between Godzilla and Kong, Legendary originally intended to produce a Godzilla trilogy, with Gareth Edwards attached to direct all films. However, Edwards left the sequel in May 2016 to work on smaller scale projects. In January 2017, Michael Dougherty was announced as the director and co-writer for the film. Principal photography began in June 2017, in Atlanta, Georgia and wrapped in September 2017. The film was released on May 31, 2019, to mixed reviews, and was a box office disappointment, grossing $386 million worldwide against a budget between $170–200 million.

Godzilla vs. Kong (2021)

In the film, Kong clashes with Godzilla as humans lure the ape into the Hollow Earth to retrieve a power source for a weapon to stop Godzilla's mysterious rampages. The film introduces Mechagodzilla, the Warbat, and the Hellhawk to the MonsterVerse.

The project was announced in October 2015 when Legendary announced plans for a shared cinematic universe between Godzilla and King Kong. The film's writers room was assembled in March 2017 and Adam Wingard was announced as the director in May 2017. Principal photography began in November 2018 in Hawaii and Australia and concluded in April 2019. After being delayed from a November 2020 release date due to the COVID-19 pandemic, the film was theatrically released internationally on March 24, 2021, and was released in the United States on March 31, 2021, where it was released simultaneously in theaters and on HBO Max. The film received generally positive reviews and was a box office success, breaking pandemic records and grossing $470 million. It was also a streaming hit, becoming the most successful launch item in HBO Max's history until it was overtaken by Mortal Kombat.

Untitled Godzilla vs. Kong sequel (2024)

Godzilla and Kong reunite against an undiscovered threat hidden deep within the Earth that challenges the existence of humans and Titans alike.

In March 2022, it was announced that a sequel to Godzilla vs. Kong is scheduled to commence filming later in the year in Gold Coast, Queensland and other locations in South East Queensland. In May 2022, it was announced that Wingard would return to direct and that Dan Stevens had been cast as the lead. Wingard and Stevens had previously worked together on The Guest. The film is scheduled to be released on March 15, 2024 in IMAX.

Future
In October 2017, Steven S. DeKnight (director and co-writer of Pacific Rim: Uprising) noted that there have been discussions about a cross-over between the MonsterVerse and Pacific Rim franchise, however, he iterated it was all theoretical possibilities. Guillermo del Toro (director and co-writer of Pacific Rim) had also expressed interest in Pacific Rim crossing over with the Monsterverse. In March 2019, when asked about the future of the MonsterVerse, Garcia stated, "It's one brick at a time, each piece has to be as good as it can be, so right now it's all focused on this [Godzilla: King of the Monsters and Godzilla vs. Kong]. But could there be? Yeah, that's the hope if the movies turn out really well."

In February 2021, Wingard stated, "I know where we could go potentially with future films." However, he noted that the MonsterVerse was created "to a certain degree" to lead towards Godzilla vs. Kong. Wingard added that the MonsterVerse is at a "crossroads", stating, "It’s really at the point where audiences have to kind of step forward and vote for more of these things. If this movie is a success obviously they will continue forward."

On April 4, 2021, Legendary's CEO Josh Grode commented on potential sequels, "we have a number of ideas for more movies." That same month, the hashtag #ContinueTheMonsterverse began trending on Twitter, which was acknowledged by Legendary and garnered support from Vogt-Roberts. On April 27, 2021, The Hollywood Reporter stated that Legendary was "quietly taking steps to stretch the series into one or more installments," while negotiating with Wingard to potentially return to direct. Various ideas were considered, including Son of Kong as one potential title.

In August 2021, Borenstein stated that "there will be some new, interesting installments coming" due to the success of Godzilla vs. Kong. Borenstein had also expressed interest in seeing Legendary produce a film with minimal human characters, stating, "I think it is possible. It would be very ambitious. I think ambitious in that Mad Max: Fury Road way. I think it’s totally possible to do that with the absolute minimum amount of human characters and really characterize the creatures."

Television

Skull Island (TBA)
In January 2021, an anime-styled animated series titled Skull Island was announced to be in development. The series will center around the adventures of shipwrecked characters, trying to escape from the titular island which is home to various prehistoric monsters. The project will be written by Brian Duffield, who will also serve as co-executive producer with Jacob Robinson. The series will be a joint-venture production between Legendary Television, Tractor Pants Productions, Powerhouse Animation Studios, and Netflix Animation. The show will be released as a streaming exclusive on Netflix.

Godzilla and the Titans (TBA)

In January 2022, Legendary announced that Apple TV+ had ordered an untitled live-action series featuring Godzilla and other Titans, with Chris Black serving as showrunner. Black and Matt Fraction will serve as co-creators and executive producers. The series will focus on "one family’s journey to uncover its buried secrets and a legacy linking them to the secret organization known as Monarch." Joby Harold, Tory Tunnell, Hiro Matsuoka and Takemasa Arita will serve as additional executive producers. 

Following the success of Godzilla vs. Kong, discussions commenced on ways that the MonsterVerse could be expanded beyond feature films. Legendary proposed a live-action series, and amongst the potential buyers, Apple TV+ expressed immediate interest and negotiated a deal to begin development. The project will be a joint-venture production between Legendary Television, Safehouse Pictures, Toho Co. Ltd., and Apple TV+ Original Series.

In June 2022, Legendary announced that Anna Sawai, Ren Watabe, Kiersey Clemons, Joe Tippett and Elisa Lasowski had been cast in the series. Matt Shakman will direct the first two episodes and also serve as executive producer. In July 2022, Kurt Russell and his son Wyatt Russell were added to the cast.

Cast and characters

Reception

Box office performance

Critical and public response

Music
For Godzilla (2014), Alexandre Desplat was announced as the film's composer in August 2013. Director Gareth Edwards chose Desplat after creating a music playlist, stating, "I dragged and dropped all my favorite soundtracks, and the person who got high score was Alexandre Desplat." Desplat accepted the job because he was impressed with Edwards' debut film Monsters and had never composed a monster film, adding that he always attempted to accept differentiating films. Desplat had organized a large orchestra that he described as "stupidly big, as big as Godzilla." He explained that the orchestra had to be big in order to avoid filling gaps in the score with electronics. Desplat had described his score as "non-stop fortissimo, with lots of brass, Japanese drums, and electric violin." He echoed the film's Japanese origins and influence by applying a shakuhachi bamboo flute and taiko drums throughout the score. While the themes of Akira Ifukube, the composer of various Godzilla films, were not used for the film, Edwards described the music as "very much in the same tone of Akira." Desplat also paid homage to Ifukube during the track "Godzilla!" by flaring the brass to reflect sounds similar to Ifukube's themes.

For Kong: Skull Island (2017), Henry Jackman blended 1970s psychedelic guitars into the score, which was considered to be a combination of mixing electronic sounds with symphony orchestra. Jackman stated that "The great thing about a monster movie is that it opens the door to use the symphony orchestra in its most sumptuous way. [Director] Jordan Vogt-Roberts was happy to celebrate the gravity and history that comes with a full orchestra, but we also explored less traditional elements. That's a field day for a composer." Vogt-Roberts also used rock music from the Vietnam-era and hits from the 70s, stating, "this provides a striking dichotomy, sets the tone and gives us great moments of fun."

For Godzilla: King of the Monsters (2019), it was announced during Comic-Con 2018 that Bear McCreary would compose the score and utilize Ifukube's themes and Yūji Koseki's Mothra theme. He chose to adapt Ifukube and Koseki's themes to form a "connection between Ifukube’s uniquely brilliant style and the aesthetics of modern blockbusters." For the film's soundtrack, McCreary produced a cover of Blue Öyster Cult's "Godzilla", that featured Serj Tankian on vocals, as well as Brendon Small, Gene Hoglan, and other members of Dethklok contributing to the cover. McCreary described the cover as "the most audacious piece of music" he had produced in his career.

For Godzilla vs. Kong (2021), Tom Holkenborg was announced as the film's composer in June 2020. During a meeting in 2018, Holkenborg admitted to director Adam Wingard to being a Godzilla fan and had composed a Godzilla theme recreationally. Wingard chose not to recycle Ifukube's theme, feeling it was "insincere" since he associated them with Toho's Godzilla. Instead, Wingard wanted to use new themes that embraced the MonsterVerse's Godzilla while honoring its influences. Holkenborg requested a bass drum roughly ten feet in diameter, but the builder was only able to scale it down to eight feet. He wanted to create a Godzilla theme that "lived and breathed" the history behind monster themes and that was slow and sluggish to reflect Godzilla. Lower brass and big tympanis were used to underscore Godzilla's power. For Kong's theme, Holkenborg used an "organic approach." The sound was interwoven with electronic and sound design elements. The score began with melody and "got colors and orchestration and different types of electronic instruments with it".

Other media

Books

Comics

Video games
Legendary's Godzilla was featured as a playable character in Bandai Namco's 2014 video game Godzilla as "Hollywood Godzilla". In 2017, a short virtual reality experience titled Kong VR: Destination Skull Island was made available at 1500 Samsung retail demo locations, in 15 AMC theater locations, and Samsung VR stores. Godzilla and Kong were featured in cross-over events for PUBG Mobile, World of Warships, Godzilla: Battle Line, and Call of Duty: Warzone.

See also
 Godzilla (franchise)
 King Kong (franchise)
 Kaiju

Notes

References

Sources

 
 

 

 

Monster movies
Giant monster films
Crossover films
Apocalyptic films
Films about nuclear war and weapons
Mass media franchises introduced in 2014
American disaster films
English-language films
Fictional universes
Horror film franchises
Action film franchises
Science fiction film franchises